Mattia Pesce (born 3 December 1989) is a male Italian swimmer. He won bronze medal in 100 metres breaststroke at the 2012 European Aquatics Championships.  He competed in the same event at the 2012 Summer Olympics.

Pesce is an athlete of the Gruppo Sportivo Fiamme Oro.

Achievements

References

External links
Swimmer profile at Federnuoto website

1989 births
Living people
Italian male swimmers
Italian male breaststroke swimmers
Swimmers at the 2012 Summer Olympics
Olympic swimmers of Italy
European Aquatics Championships medalists in swimming
Universiade medalists in swimming
Universiade bronze medalists for Italy
Swimmers of Fiamme Oro
Medalists at the 2011 Summer Universiade
20th-century Italian people
21st-century Italian people